Paula Mónica Hernández Dalli, known mostly as Paula Dalli, is a Spanish singer and actress born in L'Alfàs del Pi, Alicante on August 16, 1993. Paula is best known for being a finalist in the Spanish version of My Camp Rock and for starring in the series La Gira where she played Carol.

Discography

Soundtracks with Pop4U

Filmography

References

1993 births
Living people
Walt Disney Records artists